Rafael Advanced Defense Systems Ltd. (formerly Rafael Armament Development Authority), ("Rafael" from Hebrew acronym of "Authority for the Development of Armaments" - ) is an Israeli defense technology company. It was founded as Israel's National R&D Defense Laboratory for the development of weapons and military technology within the Israeli Ministry of Defense; in 2002 it was incorporated as a limited company.

Rafael develops and produces weapons, military, and defense technologies for the Israel Defense Forces and for export abroad. All current projects are classified.

History

Rafael was established in 1948 as the Science Corps (known by the acronym HEMED) under the leadership of Shlomo Gur. It was renamed the Research and Design Directorate in 1952. In 1952 David Ben-Gurion decided to split the activities of HEMED into two agencies. The pure scientific research was left with HEMED, while the development of weapons was placed into the new EMET agency.

In 1954 Ben-Gurion decided to change the name of EMET to RAFAEL. It was reorganized as Rafael in 1958.

In 1995, Yitzhak Rabin asked Amos Horev to become chairman of the board of Rafael, following many years in which Horev had served as chairman of Rafael's advisory committee. Horev served as chairman until January 2001.

Restructuring as a limited company
During the early 1990s Rafael was operating at a loss (peaking in 1995, with a loss of $120 million on a turnover of $460 million). Therefore, it was decided to restructure the organization and start operating Rafael as a company. Initially the new company had three discrete divisions, each operating as a profit centre, with a separate balance sheet presented to the newly formed management board.

The restructuring was completed in 2002 when Rafael was formally incorporated as a limited company (although still as a government-owned corporation), while maintaining its technological capabilities through an investment of about 10% of turnover in R&D programs. In its first year as a limited company, Rafael earned a $37 million profit on $830 million in sales. By 2016, Rafael reported annual net profits of 473 million ILS (roughly 130 million dollars), up 3%, compared with ILS 459 million in 2015. New orders in 2016 totaled ILS 10.7 billion, and sales amounted to ILS 8.32 billion, 6% more than in 2015. The company's orders backlog as of the end of 2016 was ILS 21.72 billion, 12% more than at the end of 2015.

On October 14, 2007, the company changed its name from Rafael Armament Development Authority Ltd. to Rafael Advanced Defense Systems Ltd.

Technological achievements
 Shafrir (later renamed Python) – one of the most successful air-to-air missiles ever made (during the 1973 Yom Kippur War, the IAF launched 176 Shafrir 2 missiles, destroying 106 enemy aircraft)
 Spike – a fourth generation fire-and-forget anti-tank guided missile
 Popeye – an air-to-ground missile system
 Popeye Turbo SLCM – believed to be a nuclear-tipped submarine-launched cruise missile
Iron Beam – laser missile defense system
 Iron Dome – the world's first operational air defense system to intercept short-range rockets and artillery shells
 Trophy – the world's second operational active protection system, which successfully destroyed an anti-tank missile launched from the Gaza Strip toward a Merkava Mark IV tank near Nir Oz
 Protector USV – the world's first operational unmanned surface vehicle (unmanned, autonomous  naval combat system)
 David's Sling – surface-to-air missile system

Civilian technology transfer
In 1993, Rafael Development Corporation (RDC), a technology transfer company, was established as a joint venture with Elron Electronic Industries; in order to  commercialize applications based on defense technologies for medical devices, telecommunications, and semiconductor industries.  The company has successfully established and developed   several companies including:

 Given Imaging – a pioneer in the sphere of capsule endoscopy.
 Oramir Semiconductor Equipment – developer of laser cleaning technologies for the semiconductor industry, sold to Applied Materials in 2001 for $21 million.
 Starling Advanced Communications (TASE:STLG) – provider of broadband wireless networking solutions for airliners.
 Galil Medical – a developer of cryotherapy solutions.
 SELA Semiconductor Engineering Laboratories – a provider of automated sample preparation tools for semiconductor manufacturers, sold to Camtek Intelligent Imaging.
 3DV Systems – developers of the ZCam, a time-of-flight camera products for video applications, sold to Microsoft.
 Medingo – developer of a micro pump insulin delivery system consists of two parts: a semi-disposable insulin dispensing patch and a remote control, which allows for discreet personalised insulin delivery. The company was sold to Hoffmann-La Roche's subsidiary Roche Diagnostics for $160 million as well as up to $40 million in milestone payments.

Products
 Air Defense systems
 Iron Dome
 Tamir, missile used by Iron Dome
 C-Dome (the naval version of Iron Dome)
 MIC4AD
 SPYDER
 David's Sling
 Drone Dome
 Iron Beam
 Air to Air missiles
 Python-5
 I-Derby
 I-Derby ER
 Air to Surface missile
 Spice (bomb) Family
 SPARROW family
 Rocks Family, unveiled in February 2019.
 Electronic Warfare Systems
 SKY SHIELD Escort Jamming pod
 C-GEM Active Offboard Decoy
 Precision Guided missiles
 SPIKE ER
 SPIKE LR
 SPIKE NLOS
 Sea Breaker
 Missile upgrade kits
 Electro-optical Precision Integration Kit (EPIK)
 Active Protection System
 Trophy active protection system "Windbreaker" (Hebrew: מעיל רוח)
 Remote-controlled weapon station
 Rafael OWS (nicknamed "MAG Rafael" by the IDF)
 Samson RCWS (Hebrew name: קטלנית)
 Typhoon Weapon Station for naval applications and military ships

See also 
 
Elbit (El-Op)
Israel Aircraft Industries (IAI)
Israel Association for Automatic Control
Israel Military Industries
Israel Shipyards
Military equipment of Israel
Soltam

References

The bomb in the basement, Michael Karpin, Ed Simon & Schuster.

External links 

Rafael Development Corporation
Rafael at EurpStory 2004
Rafael at the LIC-2005 conference
Rafael UK

 
Government-owned companies of Israel
Defense companies of Israel
Companies based in Haifa